The Oberaletsch Glacier (German: Oberaletschgletscher, meaning Upper Aletsch Glacier) is a valley glacier on the south side of the Bernese Alps, in the canton of Valais.

The Oberaletsch Glacier system consists of two approximately equal arms. Then the glacier flows to the south-east towards the Aletsch Glacier without reaching it. During the Little Ice Age in the middle of the 19th century the glacier was part of the Aletsch Glacier.

The Swiss Alpine Club Oberaletschhütte is above the junction of the two glacier arms and has been accessible to hikers since 2005 with a new trail from Belalp.

The area of the Oberaletsch Glacier, along with the Aletsch Glacier, was declared a UNESCO World Heritage Site in December 2001.

See also
List of glaciers in Switzerland
List of glaciers
Retreat of glaciers since 1850
Swiss Alps

External links
Oberaletsch glacier on Glaciers online
Swiss glacier monitoring network

Glaciers of Valais
Glaciers of the Alps